MVM Group (Magyar Villamos Művek Zártkörűen működő Részvénytársaság, literally: Hungarian Electrical Works Private Limited Company) is a Hungarian power company, the only one in the country responsible for the production, distribution and sale of electricity.

The company owns several power plants including its most important clean electricity source: Paks Nuclear Power Plant with a total installed capacity of 2,000 MW and has 3,501 km of transmission lines. This single nuclear power plant provides more than half of Hungary's electrical power. An expansion is currently planned to add an additional 2 1200MWe VVER reactors, allowing for Hungary to decrease its carbon emissions and potentially become one of the cleanest electricity generators in Europe, along with France and Sweden. In 2011, MVM entered into  the natural gas industry and became interested in the proposed gas pipeline South Stream. The Hungarian power company wants to add a connection to the Adriatic Sea to import liquid gas from a planned Croatian gas terminal. MVM is also a founder (along with two other state enterprises: Magyar Posta/Hungarian Post and Magyar Fejlesztési Bank/Hungarian Development Bank) of the new Hungarian state-owned mobile phone company MPVI  was going to take up in 2012, but the company itself was proven to be too expensive to even start providing service. MVM sold its share to Magyar Posta in December 2013, and the MPVI's board of directors was disbanded on 19 December 2013, finalizing MPVI's incorporation to Magyar Posta.

In the middle of 2012, MVM established a subsidiary for prepare the factual steps of Paks expansion. According to the latest plans the construction will take up in 2021 and the first new unit will be complete several years later.

References

Paks expansion became a high priority project (Napi Gazdaság)
Nagyot kaszált a gázon az MVM (index.hu, Hungarian)
Az Adriánál terjeszkedne az MVM (index.hu, Hungarian)
A Magyar Postába olvad az állami mobil (Hungarian, HVG.hu)

Electric power companies of Hungary
Economy of Hungary
Hungarian brands
Government-owned companies of Hungary